Guitarz From Marz is the debut studio album by hard rock band Tesla's lead guitarist Frank Hannon. It was released in 2005 through Frank Hannon Music.

Production
The album was released independently and sold exclusively on Hannon's website. It was also sold during his 2006-2007 solo tour.  The album was recorded in a small studio in Hannon's garage. The album is currently out of print with a possibility of re-recording it in the near future, since Hannon considered the album to be more along the lines of a demo recording than a proper album.

A digital version (mp3) of the album is also available from Amazon.

Track listing
All songs written by Frank Hannon, except as noted below:.

 "Diamondz in the Sky" - 7:02
 "Re-Evolution" - 7:07
 "Guitarz from Marz" - 8:08
 "Chain Reaction" - 4:54
 "Stop the War" (Frank Hannon, Joel Krueger) - 6:54
 "Angel" (Frank Hannon, Robbie Furiosi) - 5:39
 "Eye of the Mind" - 7:47
 "Touch of Magic" - 3:46
 "De' la Luna Acoustica" - 1:59
 "Electric Warriorz" - 6:16
 "Funk It Up!" - 5:42
 "Mobias Flip" - 3:50
 "Hyperspace" -3:54

Personnel
Frank Hannon - Electric and acoustic guitars, lead vocals, synthesizers and lunacy
 Robbie Furiosi - Drums, percussion, tympani, porch bells and lead vocal on "Angel"
 Joel Krueger - Bass guitars and mellow vibes

References

External links
Frank Hannon

2005 debut albums
Frank Hannon albums